The Bush House (also known as Bush Homeplace) is a historic house located at 3960 New Cut Road near Inman, Spartanburg County, South Carolina.

Description and history 
It was originally built in about 1830, as a hall-and-parlor plan dwelling. It was enlarged about 1850, to include a two-story, three-bay wide I-house. It features a one-story, hip roofed front porch. It has a number of notable Greek Revival details on its exterior. Also on the property is a contributing smokehouse.

It was listed on the National Register of Historic Places on October 21, 2003.

References

Houses on the National Register of Historic Places in South Carolina
Houses completed in 1830
Houses in Spartanburg County, South Carolina
National Register of Historic Places in Spartanburg County, South Carolina
1830 establishments in South Carolina
I-houses in South Carolina